A list of films produced in South Korea in 1999:

External links
 1999 in South Korea
 1999 in South Korean music

 1999 at www.koreanfilm.org

1999
South Korean
1999 in South Korea